John Knightley (died 1415/16), of Chesterton, Warwickshire was an English Member of Parliament for Warwickshire in November 1414.

References

14th-century births
1415 deaths
People from Warwickshire
15th-century English people
English MPs November 1414
Place of birth missing